Vega Island is a small island to the northwest of James Ross Island, on the Antarctic Peninsula. It is separated from James Ross Island by Herbert Sound. The island was named by Otto Nordenskjold, leader of the Swedish Antarctic Expedition (1901–04) in honour of the ship making the first voyage through the Northeast Passage, 1878-79.

Vega Island is an important site for paleontology. The region is extremely rich in terrestrial and marine fossils which span the boundary of the Cretaceous and Tertiary periods, covering the point in time when dinosaurs became extinct. Fossils found on the island include hadrosaurs, plesiosaurs, and mosasaurs.

Geography 
The island is a rare volcano type called a móberg, or tuya, which was formed by a three-stage eruption sequence below an ice cap. Stage one was a subglacial hyaloclastic eruption, which shattered the lava into glass, ash, and sand which has since weathered to yellow palagonite layers. The second phase was a lava eruption into a meltwater glacial lake contained in the ice cap, which resulted in volcanic breccia and basalt pillow lava.  The final phase was subaerial basalt lava flows on top of the previous volcanic deposits after the lake drained or boiled away. The basalt flows form a caprock along the northwest shore, which forms an impermeable layer that results in about sixty waterfalls on warm days.

See also 
 Composite Antarctic Gazetteer
 List of Antarctic islands south of 60° S
 Sandwich Bluff
 SCAR
 Territorial claims in Antarctica

References

External links 
 Antarctic Researchers to Discuss Difficult Recovery of Unique Juvenile Plesiosaur Fossil, from the National Science Foundation, December 6, 2006.
 Rocas hipabisales del grupo volcánico James Ross, Isla Vega (Spanish)

Paleontological sites of Antarctica
Argentine Antarctica
British Antarctic Territory
Chilean Antarctic Territory
Islands of the James Ross Island group